William Penick Shelton (March 12, 1871 – February 13, 1934) was an American football coach.  He was the sixth head football coach at the University of Richmond in Richmond, Virginia, serving for one season, in 1892, and compiling a record of 2–3.

Head coaching record

References

1871 births
1934 deaths
Richmond Spiders football coaches
University of Virginia alumni
People from Halifax County, Virginia